Kimmer Coppejans was the defending champion but lost to Go Soeda in the second round.

Nikoloz Basilashvili won the title after defeating Lukáš Lacko 6–1, 6–7(6–8), 7–5 in the final.

Seeds

Draw

Finals

Top half

Bottom half

References
 Main Draw
 Qualifying Draw

"GDD CUP" International Challenger Guangzhou - Singles
China International Guangzhou